Roger Bill Knapp (September 7, 1959 – March 30, 2008) was a professional tennis player from the United States.

Biography

Early life
The son of Iowa real estate developer Bill Knapp, he was born in Des Moines in 1959 and attended the local Herbert Hoover High School.

After his sophomore year he transferred to La Jolla High School in California and then took up a tennis scholarship to attend the University of South California (USC). An All-American in doubles in 1979 and 1980, Knapp graduated in 1982, then turned professional and joined the international tennis circuit.

Professional tennis
His professional appearances were delayed when he left the tour to study at a Baptist bible college, but he returned to feature in several Grand Prix events in 1984 and 1985.

Knapp, a left-handed player, made the semi-finals of the Bristol Grand Prix tournament in 1985, during which he upset then world number 27 Henri Leconte. He peaked at 146 in the world for singles and was ranked as high as 119 in doubles. His final appearance on tour was in the men's doubles draw at the 1985 US Open where he partnered with Australia's Peter Doohan to reach the second round.

Coaching
From 1986 to 1989 he served as an assistant coach for the USC Trojans tennis team, in a tenure which included a Pac-10 title. He was then head coach at Drake University until 1993. Under Knapp, Drake won successive Missouri Valley Conference titles and in 1992 featured in the NCAA team championships for the first time.

The Knapp Center, a multi-purpose arena on the Drake University campus, is named after his father, while the former Drake Tennis Center is now known as the Roger Knapp Tennis Center.

Personal life
Knapp settled in Sarasota, Florida and had two daughters.

In 2007 he went through open-heart surgery to fix an aortic aneurysm, but the following year suffered a blood clot. After undergoing further surgery he died of a heart attack, aged 48.

References

External links
 
 

1959 births
2008 deaths
American male tennis players
USC Trojans men's tennis players
Drake Bulldogs
Sportspeople from Des Moines, Iowa
Tennis people from Iowa
American real estate businesspeople
Deaths from aortic aneurysm